Anne of Cleves (1515 – 16 July 1557) was Queen of England from 6 January to 12 July 1540 as the fourth wife of King Henry VIII. Not much is known about Anne before 1527, when she became betrothed to Francis, Duke of Bar, son and heir of Antoine, Duke of Lorraine, although their marriage did not proceed. In March 1539, negotiations for Anne's marriage to Henry began, as Henry believed that he needed to form a political alliance with her brother, William, who was a leader of the Protestants of Western Germany, to strengthen his position against potential attacks from Catholic France and the Holy Roman Empire.

Anne arrived in England on 27 December 1539 and married Henry on 6 January 1540, but after six months, the marriage was declared unconsummated and, as a result, she was not crowned queen consort. Following the annulment, Henry gave her a generous settlement, and she was thereafter known as the King's Beloved Sister. Remaining in England, she lived to see the reign of Edward VI, and the coronation of Mary I, outliving the rest of Henry's wives.

Early life
Anne was born in 1515, on either 22 September, or more probably 28 June. She was born in Düsseldorf, the second daughter of John III of the House of La Marck, Duke of Jülich jure uxoris, Cleves, Berg jure uxoris, Count of Mark, also known as de la Marck and Ravensberg jure uxoris (often referred to as Duke of Cleves) who died in 1538, and his wife Maria, Duchess of Jülich-Berg (1491–1543). She grew up in Schloss Burg on the edge of Solingen.

Anne's father was influenced by Erasmus and followed a moderate path within the Reformation. He decided to side with the Schmalkaldic League and opposed Emperor Charles V. After John's death, Anne's brother William became Duke of Jülich-Cleves-Berg, bearing the promising epithet "The Rich". In 1526, her elder sister Sibylle was married to John Frederick, Elector of Saxony, head of the Protestant Confederation of Germany and considered the "Champion of the Reformation."

In 1527, at the age of 11, Anne was betrothed to Francis, the 9-year-old son and heir of Antoine, Duke of Lorraine. But because Francis was under the age of consent (10 years old) at the time of the arrangement, the betrothal was considered unofficial and was cancelled in 1535. Her brother William was a Lutheran but the family was unaligned religiously, with her mother, the Duchess Maria, described as a "strict Catholic". Her father's ongoing dispute over Gelderland with Charles V made the family suitable allies for England's King Henry VIII in the wake of the Truce of Nice. The match with Anne was urged on the king by his chief minister, Thomas Cromwell.

Wedding preparations

The artist Hans Holbein the Younger was dispatched to Düren to paint portraits of Anne and her younger sister, Amalia, each of whom Henry was considering as his fourth wife. Henry required the artist to be as accurate as possible, not to flatter the sisters. The portraits are now located in the Musée du Louvre in Paris and the Victoria and Albert Museum in London. Another 1539 portrait, by the school of Barthel Bruyn the Elder, is in the collection of Trinity College, Cambridge.

Negotiations to arrange the marriage were in full swing by March 1539. Thomas Cromwell oversaw the talks and a marriage treaty was signed on 4 October of that year. The King agreed to pay a dowry of 100,000 florins to the bride's brother. 

Henry valued education and cultural sophistication in women, but Anne lacked these traits. She had received no formal education but was skilled in needlework and liked playing card games. She could read and write, but only in German. Nevertheless, Anne was considered gentle, virtuous and docile, which is why she was recommended as a suitable candidate for Henry.

Anne was described by French ambassador Charles de Marillac as tall and slim, "of middling beauty and of very assured and resolute countenance." She was fair-haired and was said to have had a lovely face. In the words of the chronicler Edward Hall, "Her hair hanging down, which was fair, yellow and long ... she was apparelled after the English fashion, with a French hood, which so set forth her beauty and good visage, that every creature rejoiced to behold her." She appeared rather solemn by English standards, and looked old for her age. Holbein painted her with a high forehead, heavy-lidded eyes and a pointed chin.

Anne was initially to travel to England alone with her cortège-the death of her father prevented her brother and mother from traveling-but there were concerns about a beautiful, sheltered young woman who had never traveled by sea making such a journey, especially during the winter. She traveled from Düsseldorf to Cleves, and then to Antwerp where she was received by fifty English merchants.

Henry met her privately on New Year's Day 1540 at Rochester Abbey in Rochester on her journey from Dover. Henry and some of his courtiers, following a courtly-love tradition, went disguised into the room where Anne was staying. Eustace Chapuys reported:

[The King] so went up into the chamber where the said Lady Anne was looking out of a window to see the bull-baiting which was going on in the courtyard, and suddenly he embraced and kissed her, and showed her a token which the king had sent her for New Year’s gift, and she being abashed and not knowing who it was thanked him, and so he spoke with her. But she regarded him little, but always looked out the window .... and when the king saw that she took so little notice of his coming he went into another chamber and took off his cloak and came in again in a coat of purple velvet. And when the lords and knights saw his grace they did him reverence.

According to the testimony of Henry's companions, he was disappointed with Anne, feeling that she was not as described. According to the chronicler Charles Wriothesley, Anne "regarded him little", though it is unknown whether she knew this was the king. Henry then revealed his true identity to Anne, although he is said to have been put off the marriage from then on. Henry and Anne then met officially on 3 January on Blackheath outside the gates of Greenwich Park, where a grand reception was laid out.

Most historians believe that Henry's misgivings about the marriage were blamed on Anne's alleged unsatisfactory appearance and her failure to inspire him to consummate the marriage. He felt that he had been misled after his advisors had praised Anne's beauty: "She is nothing so fair as she hath been reported", he complained. Cromwell received some blame for the Holbein portrait, which Henry believed had not been an accurate representation of Anne, and for some of the exaggerated reports of her beauty. When the king finally met Anne, he was reportedly shocked by her plain appearance, and the marriage was never consummated.

Henry urged Cromwell to find a legal way to avoid the marriage but, by this point, doing so was impossible without endangering the vital alliance with the Germans. In his anger and frustration, the King turned on Cromwell, to his subsequent regret.

Marriage 

Despite Henry's very vocal misgivings, the two were married on 6 January 1540 at the royal Palace of Placentia in Greenwich, London, by Archbishop Thomas Cranmer. The phrase "God send me well to keep" was engraved around Anne's wedding ring. Immediately after arriving in England, Anne conformed to the Catholic form of worship which Henry had retained after his break with Rome. The couple's first night as husband and wife was not a successful one. Henry confided to Cromwell that he had not consummated the marriage, saying, "I liked her before not well, but now I like her much worse".

In February 1540, speaking to the Countess of Rutland, Anne praised the King as a kind husband, saying: "When he comes to bed he kisseth me, and he taketh me by the hand, and biddeth me 'Good night, sweetheart'; and in the morning kisseth me and biddeth 'Farewell, darling. Lady Rutland responded: "Madam, there must be more than this, or it will be long ere we have a duke of York, which all this realm most desireth." 

Anne was commanded to leave the Court on 24 June, and on 6 July she was informed of her husband's decision to reconsider the marriage. Witness statements were taken from a number of courtiers and two physicians which register the king's disappointment at her appearance. Henry had also commented to Thomas Heneage and Anthony Denny that he could not believe she was a virgin.

Shortly afterwards, Anne was asked for her consent to an annulment, to which she agreed. Cromwell, the moving force behind the marriage, was attainted for treason. The marriage was annulled on 12 July 1540, on the grounds of non-consummation and her pre-contract to Francis of Lorraine. Henry VIII's physician stated that after the wedding night, Henry said he was not impotent because he experienced "" (two nocturnal pollutions while in sleep).

After the annulment

Anne had been given dower lands in January 1540 to fund her household, including manors in Hampshire formerly owned by Breamore Priory and Southwick Priory. As former queen, she received a generous settlement, including Richmond Palace, and Hever Castle, home of Henry's former in-laws, the Boleyns. Anne of Cleves House, in Lewes, East Sussex, is just one of many properties she owned, though she never lived there. Henry and Anne became good friends—she was an honorary member of the king's family and was referred to as "the King's Beloved Sister". She was invited to court often and, out of gratitude for her not contesting the annulment, Henry decreed that she would be given precedence over all women in England save his own wife and daughters.

After Catherine Howard was beheaded, Anne and her brother, William, Duke of Jülich-Cleves-Berg, pressed the king to remarry Anne. Henry quickly refused to do so. She seems to have disliked Catherine Parr, and reportedly reacted to the news of Henry's sixth marriage with the remark "Madam Parr is taking a great burden on herself."

In March 1547, Edward VI's Privy Council asked her to move out of Bletchingley Palace, her usual residence, to Penshurst Place to make way for Thomas Cawarden, Master of Revels. They pointed out that Penshurst was nearer to Hever and the move had been Henry VIII's will.

On 4 August 1553, Anne wrote to Mary I to congratulate her on her marriage to Philip of Spain. On 28 September 1553, when Mary left St James's Palace for Whitehall, she was accompanied by her sister Elizabeth and Anne of Cleves. Anne also took part in Mary I's coronation procession, and may have been present at her coronation at Westminster Abbey. These were her last public appearances. As the new queen was a strict Catholic, Anne yet again changed religion, now becoming a Roman Catholic.

After a brief return to prominence, she lost royal favour in 1554, following Wyatt's rebellion. According to Simon Renard, the imperial ambassador, Anne's close association with Elizabeth had convinced the Queen that "the Lady [Anne] of Cleves was of the plot and intrigued with the Duke of Cleves to obtain help for Elizabeth: matters in which the king of France was the prime mover". There is no evidence that Anne was invited back to court after 1554. She was compelled to live a quiet and obscure life on her estates. After her arrival as the King's bride, Anne never left England. Despite occasional feelings of homesickness, Anne was generally content in England and was described by Holinshed as "a ladie of right commendable regards, courteous, gentle, a good housekeeper and verie bountifull to her servants."

Death
When Anne's health began to fail, Mary allowed her to live at Chelsea Old Manor, where Henry's last wife, Catherine Parr, had lived after her remarriage. Here, in the middle of July 1557, Anne dictated her last will. In it, she mentions her brother, sister, and sister-in-law, as well as the future Queen Elizabeth, the Duchess of Suffolk, and the Countess of Arundel. She left some money to her servants and asked Mary and Elizabeth to employ them in their households. She was remembered by everyone who served her as a particularly generous and easy-going mistress.

Anne died at Chelsea Old Manor on 16 July 1557. The most likely cause of her death was cancer. She was buried in Westminster Abbey, on 3 August, in what has been described as a "somewhat hard-to-find tomb" on the opposite side of Edward the Confessor's shrine and slightly above eye level for a person of average height.

Anne's epitaph in Westminster Abbey, which is in English, reads simply:

She also has the distinction of being the last of Henry VIII's wives to die.

Fictional portrayals
The role of Anne of Cleves was played by:
 Elsa Lanchester in The Private Life of Henry VIII, which was released in 1933. Lanchester's husband Charles Laughton played Henry VIII and won an Academy Award for his portrayal.
 Elvi Hale in the episode Anne of Cleves in the 1971 television series The Six Wives of Henry VIII.
 Pia Girard in the 2003 ITV series Henry VIII.
 Joss Stone in the Showtime cable television series The Tudors.
 Rebecca Dyson-Smith in the BBC documentary mini-series Six Wives with Lucy Worsley 
  Genesis Lynea originated the role of Cleves in the musical Six.

Footnotes

References

 
 
 
 
 
 
 
 
 
 
 
 
 
 
 
Republished in 2008, TannerRitchie Pub., Burlington,

External links

 Anne of Cleves from the online Encyclopædia Britannica.
 A quick overview of Anne's life, including a portrait gallery
 A more in-depth examination of Anne's political career
 More information on Anne's life after her annulment

|-

 
1515 births
1557 deaths
House of Tudor
Irish royal consorts
Wives of Henry VIII
People from the Duchy of Cleves
Nobility from Düsseldorf
Burials at Westminster Abbey
Repudiated queens
Annulment
House of La Marck
Deaths from cancer in England
People from Hever, Kent